This is a list of all commanders, deputy commanders, senior enlisted leaders, and chiefs of staff of the United States European Command.

Current headquarters staff
  Christopher G. Cavoli, Commander
  Steven L. Basham, Deputy Commander
  Adrian L. Spain, Chief of Staff
  Timothy D. Brown, Director, Intelligence (J2)
  Peter B. Andrysiak Jr., Director, Operations (J3) 
 Richard J. Lebel, Deputy Director, Operations for Information Operations (I/O), Integrated Air and Missile Defense (IAMD), and Nuclear Command, Control and Communications (NC3)
  Richard D. Heinz, Director, Logistics (J4)
  Daniel T. Lasica, Director, Plans, Policy, Strategy, and Capabilities (J5/8)
  William R. Daly, Deputy Director, Plans, Policy, Strategy, and Capabilities
  Edward L. Vaughn, Deputy Director, Partnering, Security Cooperation, Policy, and Space Capabilities
  Chad Raduege, Director, Cyber (J6)
  Jessica NMI Meyeraan, Director, Exercises and Assessments (ECJ7)

List of commanders of the United States European Command

Commanders of U.S. European Command by branches of service
 Army: 13
 Air Force: 4
 Navy: 1
 Marine Corps: 1
 Space Force: none
 Coast Guard: none

List of deputy commanders of the United States European Command

List of senior enlisted leaders of the United States European Command

List of chiefs of staff of the United States European Command

See also
Leadership of the United States Africa Command
Leadership of the United States Northern Command
Leadership of the United States Space Command

References

Lists of American military personnel